Little Hickman is an unincorporated community in Jessamine County, Kentucky, United States. Its post office  has been closed.

References

Unincorporated communities in Jessamine County, Kentucky
Unincorporated communities in Kentucky